Mõraste is a village in Märjamaa Parish, Rapla County in western Estonia. It is located on the bank of the Kasari River

References

Villages in Rapla County